Elisabeth Rosenthal (born April 29, 1956) is an American physician and former New York Times reporter who focused on health and environment matters. She is the author of a 2017 book, “An American Sickness”, which argues that severely distorted financial incentives are at the root of the US healthcare problems. She continues to contribute to New York Times in the 'Opinion' section.

She was previously a correspondent in the Times Beijing bureau.

Currently she is editor-in-chief of Kaiser Health News.

Education
In 1978 Rosenthal obtained her bachelor's degrees in history and biology from Stanford University.

In 1980, she received her M.A. degree in English from the University of Cambridge, where she graduated as a Marshall Scholar.

In 1986, she graduated from Harvard Medical School with an M.D. degree. She did her residency at the New York Hospital-Cornell Medical Center and worked part-time 5 years in the emergency department at New York Hospital.  She quit her medical practice in 1994.

Career
In 1994 Rosenthal began working for The New York Times as a science reporter, before covering the health and hospitals beat.
 
Starting in 1997, she worked as the Beijing correspondent for six years.

She then became the European health and environment correspondent, working out of the Times office in Rome.  In 2008 Rosenthal moved back to New York and became the paper's global environmental correspondent. In 2012 she began covering the Affordable Care Act, which started her new beat as a healthcare reporter.

Family
Rosenthal lives in New York City and Washington, D.C.

Awards
 2014: Victor Cohn Prize for Medical Science Reporting
 2020''': Gerald Loeb Award for Commentary

Selected bibliography
 An American Sickness:  How Healthcare Became Big Business and How You Can Take It Back, Penguin Press, 2017, .
 "America's Broken Health Care System", Kaiser Health News'' (2019) – winner of the Gerald Loeb Award

References

External links

1956 births
Living people
HIV/AIDS activists
American women physicians
American medical writers
Women medical writers
The New York Times writers
People from Scarsdale, New York
Harvard Medical School alumni
Marshall Scholars
Stanford University alumni
American emergency physicians
Physicians from New York (state)
Scarsdale High School alumni
20th-century American journalists
Alumni of the University of Cambridge
Gerald Loeb Award winners for Columns, Commentary, and Editorials
20th-century American women
21st-century American women
Discover (magazine) people